Agustin Castillo (born 18 April 1970) is a Dominican Republic boxer. He competed in the men's bantamweight event at the 1992 Summer Olympics.

References

External links
 

1970 births
Living people
Dominican Republic male boxers
Olympic boxers of the Dominican Republic
Boxers at the 1992 Summer Olympics
Place of birth missing (living people)
Bantamweight boxers